Peperomia vulcanicola is a species of Peperomia plant native to Ecuador. It was discovered by Casimir de Candolle in 1920. It grows in wet tropical biomes.

Etymology
The species epithet vulcanicola is derived from the Latin for inhabiting volcanoes.

References

vulcanicola
Flora of Ecuador
Species described in 1920
Taxa named by Casimir de Candolle